Phoenix caespitosa (caespitosa - Latin, clumped or tufted) is a species of flowering plant in the palm family native to the Arabian Peninsula and the deserts of Somalia. This species grows in large clumps near oases or underground springs.  The trunks are short, often subterranean, in readily clumping clusters with 3 m leaves divided into 15 to 45 cm, bluish-green leaflets.

References
Riffle, Robert L. and Craft, Paul (2003) An Encyclopedia of Cultivated Palms. Portland: Timber Press.  /  (Page 400)

External links

caespitosa
Flora of the Arabian Peninsula
Flora of Somalia
Plants described in 1929